The Legends of Jigong is a Singaporean television series based on legends about Ji Gong (1130–1207), a Chinese Buddhist monk who is revered as a deity in Chinese folk religion and folk hero in Chinese culture. It was produced by the Television Corporation of Singapore (TCS) and was first aired in Singapore on TCS Eighth Frequency (now MediaCorp Channel 8) in 1996. Xie Shaoguang, who portrayed Ji Gong and sang the theme song for the series, was nominated for the Best Actor award at the 1997 Star Awards.

Plot
Ji Gong is originally the Taming Dragon Arhat, one of the Eighteen Arhats. His apprentice, Golden Boy, accidentally allows the unruly White Tiger Star under his watch to escape from Heaven into the human world to cause trouble. Through cunning manipulations and machinations, the White Tiger Star causes the death of the patriotic Song dynasty general Yue Fei, absorbs the energy from Yue Fei's guardian star, and becomes more powerful in the process. As punishment for his failure to stop the White Tiger Star, Ji Gong is banished to the human world, where he is reincarnated as Li Xiuyuan. In the human world, he is destined to do good deeds such as fighting injustice and helping the poor, as well as to continue his quest of taming the White Tiger Star. In the meantime, Golden Boy develops a romantic relationship with Yue Yinping, Yue Fei's daughter.

Cast

 Xie Shaoguang as Ji Gong / Taming Dragon Arhat
 Yao Wenlong as Golden Boy
 Ann Kok as Yue Yinping / Li Xiaomei
 Ryan Choo as Yue Lei / Yu Hai
 Deng Shufang as Ziyi / Mo-niang
 Huang Shinan as Yue Fei
 Li Xuehuan as Yue Fei's wife
 Wu Ge as Qin Hui
 Zhu Xiufeng as Madam Wang (Qin Hui's wife)
 Brandon Wong as Qin Dai / Bai An
 Zheng Geping as White Tiger Star / Yang Qingfeng
 Zhong Shurong as Fan Zengxi
 Guan Xuemei as Fan Zengxi's wife
 Zhang Jinhua as the Queen Mother of Heaven
 Liang Tian as Taishang Laojun
 Bai Yan as the Earth Deity
 Lin Yongkun as Hu Ban Xian
 Chen Guohua as brothel owner
 Lan Zhenyi as Xiaocui
 Huang Guoxiong as Yue Yun
 Hua Shibin as Zhang Bao
 Lin Xinghong as Zhang Xian

See also
 Ji Gong, the main character in the series.
 Other media about Ji Gong:
 Ji Gong (TV series), a 1985 Chinese television series starring You Benchang and Lü Liang
 The Mad Monk, a 1993 Hong Kong film starring Stephen Chow
 The Legend of Crazy Monk, a 2009–2011 three-season Chinese television series starring Benny Chan

External links
 The Legends of Jigong on MediaCorp's website

1997 Singaporean television series debuts
1997 Singaporean television series endings
1990s Singaporean television series
Singapore Chinese dramas
Channel 8 (Singapore) original programming